The Features are an American indie rock band from Sparta, Tennessee, United States of America. The original lineup consisted of Matt Pelham, Roger Dabbs, and Don Sergio. The most recent iteration consists of Pelham, Dabbs, Rollum Haas, and Mark Bond. They have released five full-length albums and three EPs. The band has appeared twice as musical guests on Jimmy Kimmel Live!

History
Matt Pelham, Roger Dabbs, Don Sergio, and Parrish Yaw attended middle school together in the small rural town of Sparta, Tennessee. Pelham, Dabbs, and Sergio started a band when they were in the eighth grade out of boredom, playing covers of acts like Camper Van Beethoven, Neil Young, and Guns N' Roses. While in high school, they played local events like parties and talent shows. After graduation, Pelham and Dabbs moved to Murfreessboro to study music at Middle Tennessee State University while Sergio and Yaw went to Tennessee Technological University in nearby Cookeville. Pelham and Dabbs brought classmate Jason Taylor on to play drums, while Sergio brought Yaw on to play keyboards. The Features graduated to playing various bars and clubs around Murfreesboro and Nashville, eventually dropping out of college to focus on the band. Within a few years they had become a Murfreesboro fixture and signed a deal with Spongebath Records, a local independent label that featured several of the biggest rock acts in the Nashville area, such as Self, The Katies, and Fluid Ounces.

Their first release, a six-song self-titled EP, was released in 1997. Soon after, original members Don Sergio and Jason Taylor both left the band. Taylor was replaced by Rollum Haas while Sergio was not replaced. In 1998, the band recorded a full-length demo for Spongebath that was never released, although two tracks from the sessions, "Thursday" and "Rabbit March," were later released as a limited 10" vinyl record. In 1999-2000, they recorded their second full-length demo with Matt Mahaffey at his studio in Murfreesboro, which was also never released. In 2001, they released The Beginning EP. Their incessant touring and critical buzz eventually led to a deal with Universal Records. In 2004, Universal re-released The Beginning EP and the band's debut album, Exhibit A. Due to creative differences between the band and Universal, their contract was dissolved shortly before the scheduled recording sessions for their second album, leaving The Features without a label. In the wake of this decision, keyboardist Parrish Yaw left the band and was replaced by Mark Bond.

In 2006, The Features recorded and self-released their third EP Contrast. In 2007, they won the international Diesel:U:Music Awards, placing first in the Rock/Indie category and in the Public Vote award. In 2008, they released their second full-length album, Some Kind of Salvation. In 2009, the band performed at the 2009 Bonnaroo Music Festival after winning the regional competition "Bonnaroo 8 Off 8th" in Nashville by placing first with a panel of judges and a public vote.

The band soon gained a lot of exposure opening for Kings of Leon on various tours. On June 17, 2009, Bug Music CEO John Rudolph announced that his company and Kings of Leon would be entering into a joint venture to establish a new record label imprint (later named "Serpents & Snakes"). For this new imprint, Kings of Leon has the freedom to sign and champion artists of their choice. The Features were the first band to be signed to the imprint, and the first release as part of the deal was a re-release of the Some Kind of Salvation LP on July 28, 2009. In 2010, the band was the opening act for Manchester Orchestra, an indie rock band from Atlanta that shares a similar sound. Their song "From Now On" appeared on the Twilight Saga: Breaking Dawn – Part 1 soundtrack, released in November 2011. In a review of the soundtrack for Allmusic, Heather Phares called attention to the song, saying that it "turns that happiness [of finding a soulmate] into energetic pop." 

In 2011, The Features released their third album, Wilderness. A track from that album, "How It Starts," was featured in a 2012 commercial for the 2013 Ford Mustang and in the video game Saints Row IV the following year. In late 2012, the band went on a European tour with concerts in Glasgow, Manchester, Birmingham, London, Amsterdam, Berlin and Gent. In May 2012, they announced that they were working on a new full-length album. Their fourth album, the eponymous The Features, was released on May 14, 2013 and produced their highest charting single to date. Their most recent release was in 2015, their fifth album, Sunset Rock, which produced no singles. The band has not performed together publicly or released any new material since a show at Exit-In in Nashville during the Summer of 2016.

Discography

Studio albums
Exhibit A (Universal Records, 2004)
Some Kind of Salvation (self-released, 2008; Serpents & Snakes, 2009)
Wilderness (Serpents & Snakes, 2011)
The Features (Serpents & Snakes, 2013)
Sunset Rock (self-released, 2015)

Extended plays
The Features EP (Spongebath Records, 1997)
The Beginning EP (self-released, 2001; Universal Records, 2004)
Contrast EP (self-released, 2006)

Singles
List of singles, with selected chart positions and certifications, showing year released and album name.

Music videos

References

External links

The Features Official Site

Indie pop groups from Tennessee
Indie rock musical groups from Tennessee
Universal Music Group artists
Fierce Panda Records artists